Seminole is a city in and the county seat of Gaines County, Texas, United States. Its population was 6,430 at the 2010 census. Seminole and Gaines County are home to a large German Mennonite population that came to West Texas in the 1980s.

It is the birthplace of country music singers Larry Gatlin and Tanya Tucker.

History
The land for Seminole was donated by nonresident landowners to become the county seat for Gaines County. In 1906, the first move to Seminole was made by W. B. Austin and his wife Emma, who moved their general store there, which was located in Caput, Texas. During this time, several post offices found a new home in Seminole. Seminole National Bank opened its doors in 1906, followed by First State Bank in 1907. In 1912, Seminole National Bank lost over $3,000 when it was robbed. In 1914, the two banks merged to form First State Bank. In 1950, Seminole's population surpassed Seagraves, Texas, for the first time.

In 1977, some 100 families of Plautdietsch-speaking "Russian" Mennonites from Mexico bought land southwest of Seminole to settle there, but faced difficulties with immigration. In 1980, President Jimmy Carter signed legislation allowing the original 100 families to gain full citizenship. In 2016, about 6,000 Plautdietsch speakers lived around Seminole.<ref>Roslyn Cherie Burns: New World Mennonite Low German. An Investigating of Changes in Progress.Berkeley, 2016, page 26.</ref>

Geography

Climate
The climate is cold semiarid (Köppen: BSk'') affected by elevation with well defined seasons, more extreme and drier than most of the great cities of Texas. The lowest temperature measured in the state was in the city with −23 °F (−31 °C), recorded on February 8, 1933.

Demographics

2020 census

As of the 2020 United States Census, 6,988 people, 2,326 households, and 1,727 families were residing in the city.

2000 census
As of the census of 2000, 5,910 people, 2,082 households, and 1,590 families resided in the city. The population density was 1,762.3 inhabitants per square mile (681.2/km) . The 2,337 housing units had an average density of 696.9 per square mile (269.3/km). The racial makeup of the city was 80.64% White, 1.98% African American, 0.98% Native American, 0.29% Asian, 0.02% Pacific Islander, 13.52% from other races, and 2.57% from two or more races. Hispanics or Latinos of any race were 39.59% of the population.

Of the 2,082 households, 41.3% had children under 18 living with them, 61.6% were married couples living together, 11.2% had a female householder with no husband present, and 23.6% were not families. About 21.8% of all households were made up of individuals, and 10.2% had someone living alone who was 65 or older. The average household size was 2.79, and the average family size was 3.28.

In the city, the population was distributed as 31.9% under 18, 8.9% from 18 to 24, 27.2% from 25 to 44, 19.0% from 45 to 64, and 13.0% who were 65 or older. The median age was 32 years. For every 100 females, there were 92.5 males. For every 100 females age 18 and over, there were 89.4 males.

The median income for a household in the city was $32,063, and for a family was $36,019. Males had a median income of $31,563 versus $17,010 for females. The per capita income for the city was $14,624. About 14.6% of families and 18.2% of the population were below the poverty line, including 24.1% of those under 18 and 13.4% of those 65 or over.

Education and library

The City of Seminole is served by the Seminole Independent School District. The Gaines County Library celebrated its 50th anniversary in 2008.

Notable people

 Mary Ann Almager, world champion boxer, was born in Seminole
 Andrew Alvidrez, Professional Bull Rider, was born in Seminole
 La Costa (born 1951), country music artist and the older sister of Tanya Tucker, was born in Seminole
 Larry Gatlin, country and gospel music artist, was born in Seminole
 Tanya Tucker (born 1958), country music artist, the younger sister of La Costa and 2x 2020 Grammy winner, was born in Seminole

References

Cities in Gaines County, Texas
Cities in Texas
County seats in Texas